The Romford–Upminster line is a railway branch line in Greater London that connects , on the Great Eastern Main Line, to , on the London, Tilbury and Southend line and London Underground. The line is part of Network Rail Strategic Route 7, SRS 07.09, and is classified as a rural line.

, services are operated by London Overground, with two trains per hour in each direction. The timetabled journey time from one terminus to the other is nine minutes. It is completely separated from the rest of the London Overground, but connects to the Elizabeth line at Romford and the London Underground at Upminster.

History

Origins
The first line proposed to link Romford to the north shore of the River Thames was put forward by the Thames Haven Railway and Dock Company who proposed a  line from Romford to Shell Haven. An Act of Parliament was obtained in 1936 and powers were renewed 10 years later but no work was ever commenced.

Interest in a connection to the Thames waned with the building of the London, Tilbury and Southend Railway (LT&SR) but after that company gained independence from the Great Eastern Railway (GER) interest increased again and in 1882 the Romford and Tilbury Railway proposed a line from Romford to the LT&SR at Grays. This line was linked to another proposed line from Tilbury to Gravesend which included a tunnel beneath the Thames but the line failed to gain parliamentary support.

The following year the GER themselves proposed a line from Romford passing between Hornchurch and Upminster and then connecting directly to Tilbury Docks and in competition the LT&SR submitted their own proposal and it was this proposal that was authorised the following year.

Steam era
The line as originally built was a branch of the London, Tilbury and Southend Railway (LT&SR) and opened on 7 June 1893 providing the LT&SR with a link to the Great Eastern Railway (GER) at Romford. The LT&SR had requested use of  but the GER opposed this and made a counter-offer to lease the line between Romford and Upminster. This in turn found no favour with the LT&SR who eventually constructed a separate station. For the first three years the LT&SR were able to share goods facilities at Romford, but 1896 they constructed their own small goods yard where the branch joins the Great Eastern Main Line and with access to Vicroria Road. Additional freight business came after the Midland Railway takeover of the LT&SR when a private siding was added at Romford for a builders' merchants.

Initially there were 8 trains per day between Romford and Grays with a reduced service on Sundays. Trains were operated by tank engines while freight was usually hauled by a small tender engine. With the opening of the station at Emerson Park an additional late train provided connection to a train leaving  just after midnight for the use of returning theatergoers.

Emerson Park Halt was opened on 1 October 1909 with a run-round loop was constructed 500 yards to the west to enable extra trains to run between Emerson Park and Upminster. Push-pull working began in 1934 using MR 0-4-4T engines and the service frequency was increased. As locomotives were no longer required to run round their trains the loop was no longer required and was removed in circa 1936 and provision of services revesing at Emersion Park ceased on nationalisation in 1948. 

In the April 1920 timetable there are 27 down (towards Tilbury) and 22 up (towards Romford) trains a day. There were six through trains to Grays, four to Tilbury and five short runs between Emerson Park and Upminster, with a similar number of return trains. On Sundays there were nine trains in each direction. By 1939 this had increased to 35 down trains and 27 up services on weekdays, still with nine in each direction on Sundays and a similar service pattern. The London, Tilbury and Southend Railway was purchased by the Midland Railway in 1912 and was amalgamated into the London, Midland and Scottish Railway on 1 January 1923. The line became part of British Railways on 1 January 1948, initially as part of the London Midland Region and then the Eastern Region from 20 February 1949. The short workings between Emerson Park and Upminster were eliminated with all services on the line calling at Upminster, Emerson Park and Romford from the 1949 timetable. After this time services were taken over by N7 tanks and from February 1951 the Sunday service was removed.

Diesel era
From 17 September 1956, Metro-Cammell Lightweight diesel multiple units from Stratford replaced the steam service and a twice-hourly service was introduced, effectively doubling the frequency. In 1956  was enlarged and a new underground depot opened and the end through service from Romford to Grays ceased. To accommodate the truncated service, from 20 April 1957 a new bay platform numbered six opened at Upminster and as a result the link between the branch and the LT&S line was removed in 1959 effectively making it part of the Great Eastern route.

A survey of passenger numbers was carried out in 1964 as part of the Beeching report and a closure notice was rapidly published. Local opposition was loud and oraganised and the closure was rejected, mainly due to the large number of commuters using Emerson Park Halt. A further attempt at closure was made around 1970 but use of the line was increasing and the attempt again failed, but freight traffic was withdrawn with the yard at Victoria Road closing in 1974 after the private siding had succumbed a few years earlier. By the late 1970s the service was in the hands of Cravens DMUs.

At the end of diesel operation there were 31 journeys each way every day except Sunday where there was no service. There was also no service on public holidays.

Electric era
The line was electrified in the 1980s and electric trains using a single Class 315 unit based at Ilford began operating on 17 April 1986. From 1997 the line became part of First Great Eastern and subsequently National Express East Anglia under the brand "One Great Eastern". Under this franchise services were operated by Class 321 units The line transferred to become part of the London Overground network in May 2015 and services were again provided by a single Class 315 unit. Sunday service was restored from the 13 December 2015 timetable. From 5 October 2020 the line has been operated using British Rail Class 710 rolling stock, taking over from British Rail Class 315 and British Rail Class 317 rolling stock.

Infrastructure
The branch is known colloquially as the "Romford Push and Pull" and has always been single-track throughout. When first opened the LT&SR constructed a separate station building at Romford where a cast-iron footbridgeover South Street was provided to link to the GER station, this only being opened when an LT&SR train was due. This building itself was directly opposite the GER station entrance and was of 3 storeys with the booking hall on the ground floor and including accommodation for the stationmaster. In April 1934 the LT&SR building ceased use as a station and the ground floor was rented as a shop and the London and North Eastern Railway, the successor of the GER, took control of the whole station. The barriers that had restricted access between the two stations at rail level were then removed. The branch has just one signal, on approach to Romford. 

At  a small engine shed was initially provided in the area which is now occupied by the undeground depot, and the station was substantially rebuilt in the early 1930s to accommodate the District Railway extension with a separate Grays-facing bay platform being added at this time. The connection west of the station to the LT&S main line remained after th works, but was severed in 1968 with a further rebuilding of the station. There were plans to link the line from platform six at Upminster to the reception tracks of the London Underground depot there in order to enable the transfer of London Underground D78 Stock units onto the main line to be hauled away by diesel locomotive for refurbishment at the Ilford depot. These plans were scrapped when the refurbishment work was transferred to Wakefield in Yorkshire and the transfer was done by road. The point-work for this connection, which was half installed, is still visible from the eastern end of platform five at Upminster.

There is only one intermediate station, at Emerson Park. In the year 2017/18 there were over 300,000 passenger journeys to/from Emerson Park, more that three times the number 10 years previously, but still a small enough number for the line to come top of the list of least busy Overground stations.

In the mid-1980s the line was electrified at 25 kV AC. Electrification of the line saw an end to years of speculation about its future.

Services
The line is entirely within Travelcard Zone 6.

Services are currently operated by London Overground, which replaced the previous operator, Abellio Greater Anglia, in May 2015, and from the early 2020s trains have typically been formed of a Class 710.

As of June 2021, the service pattern on the route is one train every 30 minutes between approximately 6:15 am and 10 pm Mondays to Saturdays, and approximately 8:30 am and 8 pm on Sundays. The journey time from one terminus to the other is timetabled as nine minutes.

Annualised entry/exit data from Transport for London for London Overground trips is as follows:

Geology
During the construction of the railway in 1892, the geologist T. V. Holmes discovered a five-metre layer of boulder clay underlying the gravel and sand in a section just north of St. Andrew's Park. This is now the Hornchurch Cutting Site of Special Scientific Interest, which exhibits the southernmost limit of the Anglian ice sheet 450,000 years ago, the furthest south that any ice sheet reached.

References

Citation

References

Further reading

Transport in the London Borough of Havering
Railway lines in London
Standard gauge railways in London
Railway branch lines
Railway lines opened in 1893